Union Sportive Musulmane Madinet Hadjout, known as USMM Hadjout or simply USMMH for short, is an Algerian football club based in Hadjout. The club was founded on 5 March 1947  and its colours are green and white. Their home stadium, Stade du 5-Juillet-1962, has a capacity of 10,000 spectators. The club is currently playing in the Inter-Régions Division.

History

Early years

At the end of the meeting of two great football clubs of Mitidja, the Union Sportive Musulmane of Blida and Olympique de Marengo won hands down by the blidéens by the score of 3–2, USM Marengo (Union Sportive Musulmane Marengo) was born in 1947. Since its creation, a group of leaders then chaired by the late Sid Ali Embarek and a valiant team of players have succeeded in registering the USMM in gold in the annals of the history of Algiers football alongside two other Muslim clubs MC Alger and USM Blida against clubs yet helped by an administration in place such as Groupement Sportif Alger, the Olympic of Hussein Dey, AS Saint Eugène (currently Bologhine), RU Alger, Groupe Sportif Orléansville (currently Chlef), FC Blida, Sporting club d'El Biar, RC Maison-carée (currently El Harrach), the Stade Guyotvillois, Olympique de Marengo. In the 1950–51 season, USM Marengo achieved a historic rise to the highest degree of Division Honneur a point ahead of the ASPTT Alger and Abbas was the club’s top scorer, But USM Marengo did not last long and was betrayed by the experience, where he played with more experienced teams such as AS Saint Eugène, MC Alger and RU Alger and occupied the last place. In 1956, the central management of the FLN decided to cease all sporting activities of Muslim clubs. and in the 1955–56 season, USM Marengo participated in the Promotion Honneur, the last season before the independence of Algeria, where on March 4, 1956 in the 16th round and two games before the end of the season USM Marengo withdrew from the tournament, the League of Algiers office registered the packages of many Muslim clubs following the events that occurred at the match between the MC Alger and AS Saint Eugène. In Promotion Honneur, RC Kouba, USM Alger, WR Belcourt, JS Kabylie, JS El Biar and OM Saint Eugène declared general forfeiture on 11 March 1956. Given the exceptional circumstances and circumstances The league still decided to put them in the final standings in order not to penalize them (because normally the rule stipulates it is a downgrading in lower division for any general package), with a view to of a possible resumption of their activities for the next season. this withdrawal i come at the request of the National Liberation Front (FLN) in support of the revolution against French colonialism and the delivery of voice to the world after the withdrawal, he joined a number of the squad to the front in the mountains.

After independence

In the aftermath of independence, the Algerian Football Federation launched the national championship with the establishment of Critériums d'Honneur with several pools in the center, east and west, the USMM appeared in the same group as the USM Alger, USM Blida, SO Berrouaghia, Stade Guyotvillois. In 1963–64 the favorable results recorded are in the Division d'Honneur composed of major clubs such as USM Alger, USM Blida, WA Boufarik, JS Kabylie, MC Alger, S. Guyotville, AS Orléansville, CR Belcourt. Unfortunately during this sports season against WA Boufarik, USM Marengo will know purgatory, he only had one game left to play against MC Alger in the first leg, the USMM will be suspended for a firm year of any competition in addition to the return phase not played, his best scores made before its "displacement" the USMM will resist. Given the capital points recorded before its suspension, the USMM will not be relegated. The USMM was composed by excellent days such as Messaoudi Mohamed selected in the Algeria national football team alongside Rachid Mekhloufi, Mustapha Zitouni, Boubekeur Belbekri. he confirmed his position as a defender notably against Germany national football team won by Algeria, the Morocco brothers (M'hamed and Larbi) with these two the show was assured, Hamadouche Ali who later ended his career at the great RC Kouba, Saidi Zoubir a former pro of Red Star to name a few. Since the new orientations of the sports policy the USMM forced to change its acronym will become IR Hadjout, Then IRB Hadjout under direct supervision of the communal popular assembly of Hadjout, the former USMM will experience purgatory again for six years in the lower division (the first division at the time) the whole history of the sports club flew away dispossessing of its seat and "disappearance" of the archives as well as the trophies which adorned the seat of the sports family of hadjout, in particular the bouloumanes since despite the will of the people who work for the development of sport in Hadjout the club will experience ups and downs become USMM Hadjout again the basketball section will take over where it is among the tenors in the national division while the football section drowned in the depths finds its balance. In the 2009–10 season, after only one season, USMM Hadjout fell to the newly created LNF Amateur, despite occupying 13th place, which allows it to remain in the National 2, but it was decided by the Ligue de Football Professionnel and the Algerian Football Federation to professionalize the Algerian football championship, starting from the 2010–11 season Thus all the Algerian football clubs which until then enjoyed the status of semi-professional club, will acquire the professional appointment this season. the president of the Algerian Football Federation, Mohamed Raouraoua, has been speaking since his inauguration as the federation's president in Professionalism,

Players

Current squad

Notable players
Had senior international cap(s) for their respective countries.
Players whose name is listed in bold represented their countries while playing for USMM Hadjout.

 Billel Benhammouda
 Mohamed Messaoudi
 Ishak Ali Moussa
 Abdelkader Harizi
 Mohamed Walid Tiboutine
 Ismail Belkacemi
 Rachid Aftouche
 Fateh Talah

Recent seasons

Before independence

After independence

Notes

References

 
Football clubs in Algeria
Tipaza Province
Association football clubs established in 1947
1947 establishments in Algeria
Sports clubs in Algeria